Apamea quinteri is a species of cutworm or dart moth in the family Noctuidae. It is found in North America.

The MONA or Hodges number for Apamea quinteri is 9329.1.

References

Further reading

 
 
 

Apamea (moth)